Wieren is a village and a former municipality in the district of Uelzen, in Lower Saxony, Germany. Since 1 November 2011, it is part of the municipality Wrestedt.

References

Villages in Lower Saxony
Uelzen (district)